David Buckley (born 1976) is a British composer of film and television scores.

David Buckley may also refer to:

 David Joss Buckley (born 1948), British screenwriter, author, and actor
 David Buckley (Gaelic footballer) (born 2001), Irish Gaelic footballer
 David Buckley (rugby league) (fl. 2000s), rugby league footballer
 David Buckley, former CIA Inspector General appointed to the United States House Select Committee on the January 6 Attack